St Dunstan's may refer to:

 St Dunstan's Church (disambiguation)
 St Dunstan's School (disambiguation)
 Blind Veterans UK, a charity formerly known as St Dunstan's
 St. Dunstan's Farm Meadows, a Site of Special Scientific Interest in East Sussex
 St. Dunstan's Well Catchment a cave system in Somerset
 St Dunstans railway station